Passage records have been sanctioned, since 1972, by the World Sailing Speed Record Council (WSSRC).

Global

Around the world sailing record
See Around the world sailing record

Hong Kong to London
12948 nm

Transatlantic 
See Transatlantic sailing record

Northern European

Round Britain and Ireland

Round Ireland

Around the Isle of Wight
50 nm

Cowes to Dinard
138 nm

Plymouth to La Rochelle
355 nm

(Original) Fastnet Course
Cowes, Fastnet Rock, Scilly Isles, Plymouth totaling a rhum line distance of 595 nm

America's

New York to San Francisco via Cape Horn
13225 nm

Miami to New York
947nm

Antigua to Newport. R I
1560 nm

Chicago to Mackinac
289 nm

Newport to Bermuda
635 nm

Asia

Yokohama to Hong Kong
1545 nm

Taipei to Hong Kong
465 nm

Mediterranean

Marseilles to Carthage
455 nm

Trieste to Malta
740 nm

Monaco to Porto Cervo
195 nm

Oceanian

Round Australia

Sydney to Hobart
630 nm

Sydney to Lord Howe Island
408 nm

Sydney to Auckland
1265 nm

Pacific Records

Transpacific, Los Angeles to Honolulu
2215 nm

Honolulu to Yokohama
3750 nm

Yokohama to San Francisco
4482 nm

San Francisco to Yokohama
4482 nm

Hong Kong to New York
13707 nm

See also 
World Sailing Speed Record Council
Speed sailing
Speed sailing record
Transatlantic sailing record

External links and references 
 WSSRC

References

Sailing records